Lingling (Chinese: Ling hua 伶话 Línghuà or Lingling hua;) is an unclassified mixed Chinese dialect. It is spoken by 20,000 ethnic Miao in Longsheng County, Guangxi. It is only spoken within the community; with outsiders, Southwestern Mandarin is spoken.

He (2009) covers the Linghua dialect of Taiping (太平村), Pingdeng Township (平等乡), Longsheng County, Guangxi.

References

He Danpeng [何丹鵬]. 2009. 廣西龍勝伶話語音的歷史層次研究 [Study of the Longsheng (Guangxi) Linghua phonology and its historical strata]. Ph.D. dissertation. City University of Hong Kong.
Ming studies, 34–35:55, University of Minnesota, 1990

Chinese-based pidgins and creoles
Languages of China
Hmongic languages
Mixed languages